Tigrayan nationalism is an ethnic nationalism seeking marginalization and independence of Tigray people from Ethiopia. It was traced by during post-invasion of Ethiopian Empire by Kingdom of Italy in early 1940s, in response to perceived imperial Amhara dominance. It was furtherly propagated during the EPRDF coalition regime who was dominated by ethnic nationalist party TPLF since 1990s, ruling Ethiopia for 27 years until they ousted from power by Prime Minister Abiy Ahmed in 2018.

References

Ethnic nationalism
Political movements in Ethiopia
Tigray Region